Imaday Núñez González (born January 18, 1983) is a Cuban former swimmer, who specialized in breaststroke events. She won a total of three medals (gold, silver, and bronze) in the breaststroke (both 100 and 200 m) and medley relay at the 1998 Central American and Caribbean Games in Maracaibo, Venezuela.

Nunez became one of Cuba's first ever female swimmers to compete at the 2000 Summer Olympics in Sydney. There, she failed to reach the semifinals in any of her individual events, finishing thirty-first in the 100 m breaststroke (1:13.91) and thirty-fourth in the 200 m breaststroke (2:41.97).

At the 2004 Summer Olympics in Athens, Nunez competed again in the same programs as her first stint. She posted FINA B-standard entry times of 1:13.25 (100 m breaststroke) and 2:34.10 (200 m breaststroke) from the Pan American Games in Santo Domingo, Dominican Republic. In the 100 m breaststroke, Nunez challenged seven other swimmers on the second heat, including 13-year-old Yip Tsz Wa of Hong Kong. She blasted a Cuban record of 1:12.14 to earn a second spot and twenty-seventh overall behind winner Inna Kapishina of Belarus by a 1.48-second margin. In her second event, 200 m breaststroke, Nunez placed twenty-eighth on the morning's preliminaries. Swimming in the same heat as her first, she rounded out a field of six swimmers to last place by three tenths of a second (0.30) behind Mexico's Adriana Marmolejo, outside her entry time of 2:36.40.

References

1983 births
Living people
Cuban female swimmers
Olympic swimmers of Cuba
Swimmers at the 1999 Pan American Games
Swimmers at the 2000 Summer Olympics
Swimmers at the 2003 Pan American Games
Swimmers at the 2004 Summer Olympics
Female breaststroke swimmers
Sportspeople from Havana
Central American and Caribbean Games gold medalists for Cuba
Central American and Caribbean Games silver medalists for Cuba
Central American and Caribbean Games bronze medalists for Cuba
Competitors at the 1998 Central American and Caribbean Games
Central American and Caribbean Games medalists in swimming
Pan American Games competitors for Cuba